Jorge Cáceres may refer to:

 Jorge Cáceres (poet) (1923–1949), Chilean poet
 Jorge Cáceres (pentathlete) (1917–1975), Argentine pentathlete
 Jorge Cáceres (footballer), Paraguayan footballer, in 2003 FIFA World Youth Championship squads
 Jorge Luis Cáceres (born 1982), Ecuadorian writer, editor, and anthologist
 Jorge Ramón Cáceres (born 1948), former football forward